is a town located in Fukushima Prefecture, Japan. , the town had an estimated population of 15,511 in 5690 households, and a population density of 130 persons per km².

Geography

Ishikawa is located in south-central Fukushima prefecture. 
Rivers: Abukuma River

Neighboring municipalities
 Fukushima Prefecture
 Shirakawa
 Furudono 
 Asakawa
 Tamakawa
 Hirata
 Nakajima
 Yabuki
 Samegawa

Climate
Ishikawa has a humid climate (Köppen climate classification Cfa).

Demographics
Per Japanese census data, the population of Ishikawa has been in decline over the past 70 years.

History
The area of present-day Ishikawa was part of ancient Mutsu Province. During the Edo period, the area was tenryō under the direct control of the Tokugawa shogunate. After the Meiji Restoration, it was organized as part of Ishikawa District in the Nakadōri region of Iwaki Province.

The villages of Ishikawa, Sawada, Nogisawa, Bohata, Nakatani and Yamahashi were formed on April 1, 1889 with the creation of the modern municipalities system. Ishikawa was promoted to town status on March 27, 1894. During World War II, the town had a secret uranium mine for the Japanese atomic bomb project. The town expanded by annexing the neighboring villages of Sawada, Nogisawa, Bohata, Nakatani and Yamahashi on March 31, 1955.

Economy
The economy of Ishikawa is primarily based on agriculture.

Education
Ishikawa has three public elementary schools and one public junior high school operated by the town government, and one public high school operated by the Fukushima Prefectural Board of Education. There is also one private junior high school and one private high school.

Fukushima Prefectural Ishikawa High School
Ishikawa High School
Ishikawa Middle School
Ishikawa Sawada Middle School
Ishikawa Gijuku Middle School
Ishikawa Elementary School
Ishikawa Sawada Elementary School
Ishikawa Nogisawa Elementary School
Ishikawa Bobata Elementary School
Ishikawa Nakatani No. 1 Elementary School
Ishikawa Nakatani No. 2 Elementary School
Ishikawa Yamagata Elementary School
Ishikawa Minami-Yamagata Elementary School

Transportation

Railway
 JR East – Suigun Line
  -

Highway

Local attractions
Bobata Onsen
Nekonaki Onsen
Katakura Onsen

References

External links

 

 
Towns in Fukushima Prefecture